Paektu Mountain (mt. Paektu), also known as Baekdu Mountain and in China as Changbai Mountain (Manchu: Golmin Šanggiyan Alin), is an active stratovolcano on the Chinese–North Korean border. At , it is the highest mountain of the Baekdudaegan and Changbai ranges. Koreans and Manchus assign a mythical quality to the volcano and its caldera lake, considering it to be their country's spiritual home. It is the highest mountain in North Korea and Northeast China.

A large crater lake, called Heaven Lake, is in the caldera atop the mountain. This was one of the largest and most violent eruptions on Earth in the last 5,000 years.

The mountain plays an important mythological, cultural, and nationalistic role in the societies and civil religions of both North Korea and South Korea. For instance, it is mentioned in both of their national anthems and is depicted on the national emblem of North Korea. The mountain is regarded by the Manchu people as their ancestral homeland, and it was a symbol of imperial power in the Qing, the last imperial dynasty of China.

Names
The mountain was first recorded in the Chinese Classic of Mountains and Seas under the name Bùxián Shān. It is also called Shànshàn Dàlǐng in the Book of the Later Han. In the New Book of Tang, it was called Tàibái Shān. The current Chinese name,  ('ever white mountain', was first used in the Liao dynasty (916–1125) of the Khitans and then the Jin dynasty (1115–1234) of the Jurchens. The Liao Shi recorded that chiefs of 30 Jurchen tribes from Mount Changbai paid their tribute to the Liao in AD 985. According to the Song dynasty travelogue Songmo Jiwen, it was named as such because the mountain was "the abode of the white-robed Guanyin" and its birds and beasts were all white.

It means 'white-head mountain'. In other records from the same period, the mountain was also called , which means 'great-white mountain'.

In English, various authors have used nonstandard transliterations.

Geography and geology

From mid-October to mid-June, the lake is typically covered with ice. In 2011, experts in North and South Korea met to discuss the potential for a significant eruption in the near future, as the volcano explodes to life every 100 years or so, the last time in 1903.

The geological forces forming Mount Paektu remain a mystery. Two leading theories are first a hot spot formation and second an uncharted portion of the Pacific Plate sinking beneath Mount Paektu.

Sixteen peaks exceeding  line the caldera rim surrounding Heaven Lake. The highest peak, called Janggun Peak, is covered in snow about eight months of the year.

Water flows north out of the lake, and near the outlet there is a  waterfall. The mountain is the source of the Songhua, Tumen and Yalu rivers. The Tumen and the Yalu form the northern border between North Korea and Russia and China.

Climate

The weather on the mountain can be very erratic, sometimes severe. The relative humidity averages 74%.

Geological history
Beginning in about 5 million years ago, Paektu volcano erupted mainly a series of basaltic lava flows, forming a lava plateau. The construction of the cone of the volcano began in approximately 1 million years ago as the eruptive materials transitioned into trachytic pyroclastic and lava flows. During the cone-construction stage, major Plinian-type eruptions occurred in 448, 67.6, 85.8 and 24.5 thousand years ago (ka) and deposited ash in the Japan sea. The construction of cone was terminated with two well-recognized major explosive eruptions, Tianwenfeng and Millennium.

Tianwenfeng eruption
Tianwenfeng eruption is the formation of a widespread thick layer of grey, yellow pumice preceding the Millennium eruption. The exact age of eruption is uncertain since different dating techniques have assigned 4, 51, 61, and 74 ka to this deposit. This eruption formed large areas covered in yellow pumice and ignimbrite. Proximal deposits of pumice fall of the Tianwenfeng are thicker than those of the Millennium eruption. This suggests that the eruption of the Tianwenfeng is significant and maybe of similar magnitude to the Millennium eruption, making the Tianwenfeng eruption also of VEI 6–7.

Millennium eruption

The mountain's caldera was created in 946 by the colossal (VEI 6) "Millennium" or "Tianchi" eruption, one of the most violent eruptions in the last 5,000 years, comparable to the 230 AD eruption of Lake Taupō and the 1815 eruption of Mount Tambora. The eruption, whose tephra has been found in the southern part of Hokkaidō, Japan, and as far away as Greenland, destroyed much of the volcano's summit, leaving a caldera that today is filled by Heaven Lake.

Recent events

After these major eruptions, Mount Paektu had at least three smaller eruptions, which occurred in 1668, 1702, and 1903, likely forming the Baguamiao ignimbrite, the Wuhaojie fine pumice, and the Liuhaojie tuff ring.

In 2011, the Government of North Korea invited volcanologists James Hammond of Imperial College London and Clive Oppenheimer of the University of Cambridge, to study the mountain for recent volcanic activity. Their project was continuing in 2014 and expected to last for another "two or three years". American volcanologist Kayla Iacovino also participated, becoming one of the first foreign women scientists to do research in North Korea.

Flora and fauna

There are five known species of plants in the lake on the peak, and some 168 have been counted along its shores. The forest on the Chinese side is ancient and almost unaltered by humans. Birch predominates near the tree line, and pine lower down, mixed with other species. There has been extensive deforestation on the lower slopes on the North Korean side of the mountain.

The area is a known habitat for Siberian tigers, bears, wolves, and wild boars. The Ussuri dholes may have been extirpated from the area. Many wild birds such as black grouse, owls, and woodpecker are known to inhabit the area. The mountain has been identified by BirdLife International as an Important Bird Area (IBA) because it supports a population of scaly-sided mergansers.

History
The mountain has been worshipped by the surrounding peoples throughout history. Both the Koreans and Manchus consider it sacred, especially the Heaven Lake in its crater.

Korea

The mountain has been considered sacred by Koreans throughout history. According to Korean mythology, it was the birthplace of Dangun, the founder of Gojoseon (2333–108 BC), whose parents were said to be Hwanung, the Son of Heaven, and Ungnyeo, a bear who had been transformed into a woman. The Goryeo and Joseon dynasties also worshiped the mountain.

The Goryeo dynasty (935–1392) first called the mountain Paektu, recording that the Jurchens across the Yalu River were made to live outside of Mount Paektu. The Joseon dynasty (1392–1910) recorded volcanic eruptions in 1597, 1668, and 1702. In the 15th century, King Sejong strengthened the fortification along the Tumen and Yalu rivers, making the mountain a natural border with the northern peoples. Some Koreans claim that the entire region near Mount Paektu and the Tumen River belongs to Korea and parts of it were illegally given away by Japanese colonialists to China through the Gando Convention.

Mount Paektu is mentioned in the national anthems of both North and South Korea and in the Korean folk song "Arirang".

Dense forest around the mountain provided bases for Korean armed resistance against the Japanese occupation, and later communist guerrillas during the Korean War. Kim Il-sung organized his resistance against the Japanese forces there, and North Korea claims that Kim Jong-il was born there, although records outside of North Korea suggest that he was actually born in the Soviet Union.

The peak has been featured on the state emblem of North Korea since 1993, as defined in Article 169 of the Constitution, which describes Mt. Paektu as "the sacred mountain of the revolution". The mountain is often referred to in slogans such as: "Let us accomplish the Korean revolution in the revolutionary spirit of Paektu, the spirit of the blizzards of Paektu!" North Korean media also celebrates natural phenomena witnessed at the mountain as portentous, and Korean Central Television's weather reports list Paektu behind only Pyongyang. The mountain's name is used for various products, such as the Paektusan rocket, the Paektusan computer, and the Mt Paektu handgun.

China
Mount Changbai was regarded as the most sacred mountain in the shamanist religion of the Manchus, and their ancestors Sushen and Jurchens. The Jin dynasty bestowed the title "the King Who Makes the Nation Prosperous and Answers with Miracles" on the mountain in 1172 and it was entitled "the Emperor Who Cleared the Sky with Tremendous Sagehood" in 1193. A temple for the mountain god was constructed on the northern side.

The Manchu clan Aisin Gioro, which founded the Qing dynasty of China, claimed their progenitor Bukūri Yongšon was conceived near Paektu Mountain. In 1682, 1698, 1733, 1754 and 1805, Qing emperors visited Jilin and paid homage to the mountain. The rites at Mount Changbai were heavily influenced by the ancient Feng Shan ceremonies, in which Chinese emperors offered sacrifices to heaven and earth at Mount Tai. The Kangxi Emperor claimed that Mount Tai and Changbai belong to the same mountain range, which runs from northeast to southwest but is partially submerged under the sea before reaching Shandong. The geography and feng shui of Mount Changbai thus provided legitimacy to the Aisin Gioro clan's rule over China.

Baishan Heishui, "white mountain and black river", referring to Mount Changbai and the Heilongjiang, has been a traditional name for Northeast China since the Jin dynasty.

Disputes and agreements

Historical

According to Annals of the Joseon Dynasty, the Yalu and Tumen Rivers were set as the borders in the era of the founder of Joseon Dynasty, Taejo of Joseon (1335–1408). Because of the continuous entry of Korean people into Gando, a region in Manchuria that lay north of the Tumen, Manchu and Korean officials surveyed the area and negotiated a border agreement in 1712. To mark the agreement, they built a monument describing the boundary at a watershed, near the south of the crater lake at the mountain peak.  The interpretation of the inscription caused a territorial dispute from the late 19th century to the early 20th century, and is still disputed by academics today. The 1909 Gando Convention between China and Japan, when Korea was under Japanese rule, recognized the area north and east as Chinese territory.

Recent 
In 1962, China and North Korea negotiated a border treaty to resolve their undemarcated land border. China received 40% of the crater lake and North Korea kept the remaining land, holding approximately 54.5% of the territory. Neither of this treaty is recognized by the governments of the Republic of China on Taiwan and the Republic of Korea.

Some South Korean groups argue that recent activities conducted on the Chinese side of the border, such as economic development, cultural festivals, infrastructure development, promotion of the tourism industry, attempts at registration as a World Heritage Site, and bids for a Winter Olympic Games, are an attempt to claim the mountain as Chinese territory. These groups object to China's use of the name Mount Changbai. Some groups also regard the entire mountain as Korean territory that was given away by North Korea in the Korean War.

During the 2007 Asian Winter Games, which were held in Changchun, China, a group of South Korean athletes held up signs during the award ceremony which stated "Mount Paektu is our territory". Chinese sports officials delivered a letter of protest on the grounds that political activities violated the spirit of the Olympics and were banned in the charter of the International Olympic Committee and the Olympic Council of Asia. Officials from the South Korean athletic team apologized to China.

South Korea claims the caldera lake and the inside part of the ridge.

Sightseeing
In addition to domestic tourists, most international visitors, including many South Koreans, climb the mountain from the Chinese side, though it is also a popular tourist destination for visitors to North Korea. The Chinese tourism area is classified as a AAAAA scenic area by the China National Tourism Administration.

There are a number of monuments on the North Korean side of the mountain. Paektu Spa is a natural spring and is used for bottled water. Pegae Hill is a camp site of the  allegedly led by Kim Il-sung during their struggle against Japanese colonial rule. Secret camps are also now open to the public. There are several waterfalls, including the Hyongje Falls which splits into two about a third of the way from the top. In 1992, on the occasion of the 80th birthday of Kim Il-sung, a gigantic sign consisting of metal letters reading "Holy mountain of the revolution" was erected on the side of the mountain. North Koreans claim that there are 216 steps leading to the top of the mountain, symbolizing Kim Jong-il's 16 February birth date, but in reality there are more. On the North Korean side of the mountain, there is a funicular system with two cars. This was updated with new funicular cars built by the Kim Chong-t'ae Electric Locomotive Works, with the new cars successfully running on the funicular from October 30.

In popular culture
The mountain is the setting of the volcanic eruptions in the 2019 South Korean disaster film Ashfall, causing severe earthquakes in the Korean peninsula.

See also

 Geography of North Korea
 Baekdudaegan Mountain Range
 Changbai Mountain Range
 Jong-il Peak
 List of ultras of Northeast Asia
 List of mountains in Korea
 List of volcanoes in Korea
 List of volcanoes in China
 Geography of China
 Mt. Paektu (poem)
 Sacred mountains
Five Mountains of Korea

References

Further reading

External links

 "Changbaishan" Global Volcanism Program. (Smithsonian Institution)
 Global Volcanism Program
 Virtual Tour: 360 degree interactive panorama of Mount Paektu (DPRK 360, September 2014)
 The Scenery of Mt. Paektu at Naenara
 A slide show about Paektusan 
 

AAAAA-rated tourist attractions
Active volcanoes
Biosphere reserves of North Korea
Calderas of Asia
China–North Korea border
Geography of Northeast Asia
Highest points of Chinese provinces
Highest points of countries
Important Bird Areas of North Korea
International mountains of Asia
Landforms of Jilin
Mountains of China
Mountains of North Korea
Ryanggang
Sacred mountains
Holocene stratovolcanoes
Supervolcanoes
Tourism in North Korea
Two-thousanders of Asia
VEI-7 volcanoes
Volcanoes of China
Volcanoes of North Korea